Emily Larson (born 1973) is an American politician and the current mayor of Duluth, Minnesota. She is a member of the Minnesota Democratic-Farmer-Labor Party.

Larson was elected mayor of Duluth in November 2015 and inaugurated on January 4, 2016, the first female mayor in the city's history. She won reelection in 2019. Prior to becoming mayor, she was a member of the Duluth City Council.

Life and education
Emily Larson was born and raised in St. Paul, the youngest of three children. Her mother, a poet, and her father, an information technology worker, divorced when she was 10 years old, but both later remarried. She graduated with a Bachelor's Degree in social work from the College of St. Scholastica and later earned a Master's Degree from the University of Minnesota-Duluth. A graduate of the Intermedia Arts Creative Community Leadership Institute, Larson served on the advisory committee that developed the Duluth Energy Efficiency Program (DEEP).

She has worked in Duluth for CHUM, a charity assisting homeless people and people at high risk for homelessness, and as a consultant to other non-profit organizations. She owns a small business that specializes in helping non-profits.

Political career
Larson finished first in the 2011 election for an at-large city council position, and was elected president of the Duluth City Council. She served for one term until she was elected mayor of the city.

Mayor of Duluth
In November 2015 Larson won election as the first female mayor of Duluth, with almost 72% of the total votes. She was inaugurated on January 4, 2016, at a ceremony held at the Duluth Entertainment Convention Center.

She was again reelected in 2019, this time with about 64% of the total votes.

Personal life
She is married to Doug Zaun, co-owner of Duluth-based design firm Wagner Zaun Architecture, and together they have two sons.

Larson is an active trail runner and fitness enthusiast.

Electoral history

Voters could cast up to two votes

See also
List of mayors of Duluth, Minnesota

References

External links
City of Duluth webpage
Emily Larson's facebook page

Living people
1970s births
Politicians from Saint Paul, Minnesota
College of St. Scholastica alumni
University of Minnesota Duluth alumni
Mayors of Duluth, Minnesota
Minnesota city council members
Minnesota Democrats
Women city councillors in Minnesota
21st-century American women